Pant-glas Farmhouse and its associated barn at Llanishen, Trellech, Monmouthshire date from the early 16th and 17th centuries respectively and are both Grade II* listed buildings.

History and description
The Monmouthshire antiquarian Sir Joseph Bradney records Pant-glas as the historic home of the Probert family, landowners and High Sheriffs of Monmouthshire. The earliest datable elements of the house are the cellars, from the late 15th or early 16th century. The existing main block of the house is from the early 17th century, while the barn is thought to have been built later in that century. Although of a construction date of 1590 to 1620, the house uses much material of earlier dates, including medieval stonework and an Elizabethan doorcase and the architectural historian John Newman notes the suggestion that some of the masonry came from Raglan Castle,  to the west of Pant-glas. The complex building history leads Newman to call the house a "fascinating puzzle" and Cadw notes its construction is open to "several possible interpretations". 

From the mid-17th century the house was let, the Proberts having built a new mansion, The Argoed at Penallt. The barn is most likely of this date, although it could be slightly earlier. The farmhouse and barn remain private residences.

The house is tall and constructed of "well-cut" old red sandstone. It is on a L-plan. The entrance front was re-designed in the 18th century, to give what Cadw describes as a Georgian appearance. The pediment carries a date of 1752 (Newman) or 1732 (Cadw). The roof has a steep pitch and is of concrete and Welsh slate tiles, with dormer windows dating from the 1970s. The interior has been extensively remodelled but still contains some early features including a late-medieval fireplace.

The barn is "unusually large" and mostly unaltered, except for the roof skylights. The house and the barn have separate Grade II* listed building designations.

Notes

References 
 

Buildings and structures in Monmouthshire
Grade II* listed buildings in Monmouthshire